The southern sooty woodpecker (Mulleripicus fuliginosus) is a bird in the family Picidae. It is threatened by habitat loss.

Both the southern sooty woodpecker and the northern sooty woodpecker were previously considered to be subspecies of the same species, Mulleripicus funebris, known simply as the "sooty woodpecker". They were split as distinct species by the IOC in 2021.

Description 
EBird describes the bird as "A large woodpecker of lowland forest in the southern Philippines. Overall sooty-gray with a fairly long pointed tail, fine speckling on the head, pale eyes, and an ivory-colored bill. Male has a red mark from the base of the bill to the cheek. Occurs together with Buff-spotted Flameback and White-bellied Woodpecker, but has a plain gray belly. Voice includes high-pitched chips and squeals."

The breeding season is reported as April to August in Samar and Leyte.

Habitat and Conservation Status 
Its natural habitats are at  tropical moist lowland primary forest  up to 1,000 meters above sea level. They cannot seem to tolerate degraded habitats and secondary forest.

The IUCN Red List has assessed this bird as vulnerable with the population believed to be on the decline. Its main threat is habitat destruction through both legal and Illegal logging, conversion into farmlands through Slash-and-burn, charcoal burning, and mining. Its preference for low altitudes suggests that it must have suffered population losses with the loss of lowland forest in the Philippines.

There are currently no species specific conservation plans. It occurs in a few protected areas on Pasonanca Natural Park and Samar Island Natural Park. However, as with most areas in the Philippines, protection from hunting and illegal logging is lax.

Conservation actions proposed are  surveys to assess the total population size and locate strongholds. Monitor habitat trends. Increase the area of primary forest in the species' range that receives effective protection. Carry out long term habitat restoration with native tree species.

References

southern sooty woodpecker
Endemic birds of the Philippines
southern sooty woodpecker